Leslie Kellett (1915 – 9 January 2002) was a British professional wrestler who rose to prominence due to the popularity of televised wrestling in the 1960s and 1970s. He was born in Laisterdyke, Bradford, West Riding of Yorkshire, the son of Bill Kellett, a Bradford engineer, and Sarah Kellett.

Les was an engineer in the merchant navy and was demobbed in Manchester, where a meeting with Joe Hill led him to consider life as a professional wrestler. During the 1950s he earned between £40 and £50 and was fighting five to six times a week all over the country. In the 1960s Kellett was nominated for the ITV Sports Personality of the Year and was presented to Prince Philip at the Royal Albert Hall in the 1970s.

In the 1970s, he could regularly be seen on ITV's Saturday afternoon sports show-case, World of Sport. Although well known for his comic antics he was respected and feared in equal measure by his fellow professionals and was regarded as one of the toughest opponents in the sport. One of his standard tactics was to appear punch-drunk and almost defeated in a match, before suddenly recovering his ability and delivering the decisive move.

The money he earned from his wrestling appearances was not considerable and he supplemented his earnings by working a small holding and café called "The Terminus" in Thornton (close to the terminus of Bradford Trolleybus route 7), with his wife Margaret. On two acres behind the house Kellett sometimes bred pigs and once said he kept fifty head of cattle. Although not seen in televised action after the 1970s, he is still fondly remembered as one of its most endearing characters.

Kellett died peacefully in his sleep, in Ilkley, two years after he moved to a nursing home, at the age of 86, leaving a widow, Margaret, son Christopher and two grandchildren, Robert and Keeley. His other son, David Barrie, with whom he used to wrestle as a tag partner and who was a popular middleweight wrestler in his own right, had died in 2000.

References

 Profile at Online World of Wrestling
 Wrestling Heritage - wrestlers' biographies
 

1915 births
2002 deaths
English male professional wrestlers
Mass media people from Bradford
Entertainers from Yorkshire